Milfe Dacula, better known by her stage name Klaudia Koronel (born 19 December 1975 in Zamboanga del Sur, Philippines), is a Filipina businesswoman and former actress.

Career
She did sexy movies such as Pisil (1998) with Rodel Velayo, Kesong Puti (1999) with Roy Rodrigo, and Anakan Mo Ako (1999) with Gino Ilustre. She appeared in action movies with Monsour del Rosario in Dugo Ng Birhen: El Kapitan (1999), Jeric Raval in Sagot Ko Ang Buhay Mo (2000), Lito Lapid in Pasasabugin Ko Ang Mundo Mo (2000), and Ronnie Ricketts in Mano Mano 2 (2001). Koronel appeared in comedy films like Torotot (2001) with Leo Martinez, and Kapitan Ambo: Outside De Kulambo (2001) with Eddie Garcia.

She was one of the leading ladies in the TV sitcom Kiss Muna (2000-2001) with Joey de Leon, aired in GMA Network. She was included in the cast of ABS-CBN TV series Mga Anghel na Walang Langit (2005-2006). 
 
Koronel was nominated for Gawad Urian Award as Best Supporting Actress for Live Show (2000).

Personal life
Koronel was born as Milfe Dacula and the eldest of six children in a small community in Zamboanga del Sur, Philippines. Her father was a carpenter and her mother was a beautician. Her parents separated during her childhood. After her mother abandoned their home, Milfe had to care for her father who then left her and young siblings to their grandmother when he went to the capital, Manila.

The former actress told her bitter childhood experience of physical abuse from her father who sometimes had her chained. She detailed that he strikes her head with a cooking ladle and he'll only stop if he sees blood on her forehead and face. Afterwards he'll cry and say, "It's your fault." Those kind of incidents are the reasons she harbored negative feelings against her father during that time.

Despite the situation her broken family was in, she never thought of rebelling and only focused on her schooling under the guidance of her strict but responsible grandmother. She remembers crossing rivers on foot and wading in garbage-filled waters just to reach and attend school.

As a young adult, she also had to leave her provincial life to escape poverty and seek a better life in Manila. To survive, Koronel worked waitress jobs at the restaurant where she met the movie producer, Robbie Tan who was scouting for new talent that can replace the famous sexy actress, Rosanna Roces. She initially rejected his job offer as she's naturally timid, shy, and never dreamt of being a movie actress but later changed her mind due to the bad treatment she received from the poor environment she was in, hoping the opportunity would turn her fortune around.

Koronel's decision for movie fame gave her success in 1997 when was launched as a sexy actress and she starred in a series of successful movies. Her sudden fame and fortune did not make her forget to care for her younger siblings and even both her estranged parents.

At the height of Koronel's acting career and fame, she left the industry after her movie, "Live Show" (Toro) and decided to complete her college education in New Era University with a degree in BS Computer Science in 2005. She started her own Internet business soon afterwards.

Koronel married Andy Zhang, a Chinese-American businessman, on August 28, 2009 at the Iglesia ni Cristo Temple in Diliman, Quezon City, Philippines. The couple moved to Gilbert, Arizona, USA where her spouse, Andy, set up a homecare business for her.

After one year, it was reported that the couple separated but remained friends. Every year, she visits her only son, Zandy, (born in 2006) who is in the care of her family in Laguna, Philippines.

Filmography
Estasyon (2009) - Mon Confiado
Super Inggo (2006-2007)
Mga Anghel na Walang Langit (TV series) (2005-2006) - Carl John Barrameda
Spirits (TV series) (2004) - Rayver Cruz
Kapitan Ambo: Outside De Kulambo (2001) - Eddie Garcia
Mano Mano 2: Ubusan Ng Lakas (2001) - Ronnie Ricketts
Torotot (2001) - Leo Martinez
Larger Than Life (2001) - Dante Rivero
Pasasabugin Ko Ang Mundo Mo (2000) - Lito Lapid
Sagot Ko Ang Buhay Mo (2000) - Jeric Raval
Ang Babaeng Putik (2000) - Carlos Morales
Live Show (2000) - Simon Ibarra
Masarap Habang Mainit (2000) - Julio Diaz
Kiss Muna (TV sitcom) (2000-2001) - Joey de Leon
Dugo Ng Birhen: El Kapitan (1999) - Monsour del Rosario
Gamugamong Dagat (1999) - Gary Estrada
Hubad Sa Ilalim Ng Buwan (1999) - Joel Torre
Anakan Mo Ako (1999) - Gino Ilustre
Kesong Puti (1999) - Roy Rodrigo
Pisil (1998) - Rodel Velayo
Linggo Lang Ang Pahinga... Dapat Lang! (1997) - Anton Bernardo
Walang Dayaan Akin Ang Malaki (1997) - Jestoni Alarcon

References

External links

1975 births
Living people
20th-century Filipino actresses
21st-century Filipino actresses
21st-century Filipino businesspeople
Filipino expatriates in the United States
Members of Iglesia ni Cristo
New Era University alumni
People from Zamboanga del Sur
Filipino television actresses
Filipino film actresses